The spotted honeyguide (Indicator maculatus) is a species of bird in the family Indicatoridae.
It is found in Angola, Benin, Cameroon, Central African Republic, Republic of the Congo, Democratic Republic of the Congo, Ivory Coast, Equatorial Guinea, Gabon, Gambia, Ghana, Guinea, Guinea-Bissau, Liberia, Mali, Nigeria, Senegal, Sierra Leone, South Sudan, Togo, and Uganda.

References

spotted honeyguide
Birds of Sub-Saharan Africa
spotted honeyguide
spotted honeyguide
Taxonomy articles created by Polbot